

A
AG magazin

B

C
Cosmopolitan Serbia

D - G

H
Hello
Heroina, music

K
Kuhinjica

L
Lepota & Zdravlje

M
Miroljub

N
Nadrealista Danas i Ovde
Naše novine
Nedeljnik
Newsweek Serbia
NIN (magazine)
Nova srpska politička misao

O

P
Politikin Zabavnik
Pop Express, music

Q

R
Republika (Serbian magazine)

S
SciTech (magazine)
Skamija

T - U

V
Vasiona
Vreme

W - Y

Z
Zvonik

Defunct

Aerosvet
Duga
Džuboks, music
Evropa
Evropljanin
Galaksija
Hard Metal, music
Izgled
Naše novine
Pogledi
Ritam, music
Ritam (Novi Sad), music
Rock, music
Rock Express, music
Signal, International Review of Signalist Research
Smederevska Sedmica
Standard
Tempo
Vreme zabave, music
YU rock magazin, music

See also 
Media in Serbia
List of newspapers in Serbia
List of Serbian-language journals
List of academic journals published in Serbia

References

Serbia
magazines